Many video games based on the manga and anime Shaman King have been released. Later games featured many manga-exclusive stories that the anime never covered.  This allowed such characters as Redseb and Sati Saigan to be featured.

Video games

Other games

References

Shaman King video games
Shaman King video games
 List
Shaman King